Marley is a posthumous two-disc soundtrack album by Bob Marley & The Wailers. It was released by Island Records and Tuff Gong Records. The soundtrack features music from the whole career of Bob Marley, his first recorded song, "Judge Not", to the last album he released in his lifetime, "Uprising". Marley was released to coincide with the release of Marley, a biographical film documenting the life of Bob Marley.  The album features 24 of the 66 tracks used in the film.

Track listing
Disc one

Disc two

2012 soundtrack albums
2012 compilation albums
Bob Marley and the Wailers compilation albums
Compilation albums published posthumously